The 1995–96 Latvian Hockey League season was the fifth season of the Latvian Hockey League, the top level of ice hockey in Latvia. Eight teams participated in the league, and Riga Alianse won the championship.

Regular season

Playoffs 
Quarterfinals
HK Nik's Brih Riga - Vital Riga 2-0 on series
Riga Alianse - HK Laterna Riga 2-0 on series
Essamika Ogre - HK Lido Nafta Riga 2-0 on series
Juniors Riga - BHS Essamika Ogre 2-0 on series
Semifinals
Riga Alianse - HK Nik's Brih Riga 2-0 on series
Essamika Ogre - Juniors Riga 2-1 on series
Final
Riga Alianse - Essamika Ogre 3-1 on series

External links
 Season on hockeyarchives.info

Latvian Hockey League
Latvian Hockey League seasons
Latvian